Prodentalium is a genus of fossil scaphopod assigned to the Dentalids, but on somewhat dubious grounds.

References

Scaphopods
Paleozoic life of Alberta
Paleozoic life of Nunavut